"The Dicks Hate the Police" (usually shortened to "Hate the Police") is the debut release and 7-inch single from the American hardcore punk band The Dicks, released in 1980. The record was released on the band's own Radical Records imprint. Mudhoney included a cover of the song on Superfuzz Bigmuff Plus Early Singles.

Critical reception
Pitchfork wrote that "the song contained few words and fewer chords, and yet, with an arch sneer, the singer—Gary Floyd, a genuine punk hero deserving of recognition beyond the underground—communicated the essence of state power deployed in its most wretched everyday form." The A.V. Club called it a "classic," writing that "even removed from its historical and geographical contexts 'Hate The Police' remains a powerful song." The Dallas Observer called it "perhaps the finest single ever released by a Texas punk band."

Track listing
 The Dicks Hate the Police
 Lifetime Problems
 All Night Fever

Line up
Gary Floyd – Vocals
Glen Taylor – Guitar
Buxf Parrot – Bass, vocals on "All Night Fever"
Pat Deason – Drums

References

1980 debut singles
1980 songs
The Dicks albums
Protest songs
Songs against racism and xenophobia
Songs about police officers